Robert Allen Reynolds (born January 21, 1947) is a former middle-relief pitcher who played in Major League Baseball between  and . He batted and threw right-handed.

Career
Reynolds was drafted out of Ingraham High School in Seattle, WA. He was a first round pick (18th overall) in the 1966 June amateur baseball draft, and spent 15 seasons in professional baseball. After being drafted by the San Francisco Giants, he was selected by the Montreal Expos in the 1968 MLB expansion draft. 
 
Reynolds reached the majors in 1969 with the Expos, spending one year with them, appearing in only one MLB game in his big league debut, before moving on to the St. Louis Cardinals, Milwaukee Brewers, Baltimore Orioles, Detroit Tigers and Cleveland Indians. 

The next year he again went 7–5, recording seven saves and appearing in a career-high 54 games. 

He also appeared in the 1973 and '74 American League Championship Series with the Orioles.
 
In a six-season major league career, Reynolds posted a 14–16 record with a 3.15 ERA and 21 saves in 140 games.

References

External links

Frank Robinson's incident - Baseballbiography.com

1947 births
Living people
Amarillo Giants players
American expatriate baseball players in Canada
American expatriate baseball players in Japan
American expatriate baseball players in Mexico
Arizona Instructional League Giants players
Baltimore Orioles players
Baseball players from Seattle
Buffalo Bisons (minor league) players
Cleveland Indians players
Detroit Tigers players
Evansville Triplets players
Florida Instructional League Expos players	
Fresno Giants players
Magic Valley Cowboys players
Major League Baseball pitchers
Mexican League baseball pitchers
Miami Amigos players
Milwaukee Brewers players
Montreal Expos players
Nippon Professional Baseball pitchers
Rochester Red Wings players
St. Louis Cardinals players
Taiyō Whales players
Tigres del México players
Toledo Mud Hens players
Vancouver Mounties players
Winnipeg Whips players